Solatia is a genus of sea snails, marine gastropod mollusks in the family Cancellariidae, the nutmeg snails.

Species
Species within the genus Solatia include:
 Solatia buccinoides (Sowerby, 1832)
 † Solatia exwestiana (Sacco, 1894) 
 Solatia piscatoria (Gmelin, 1791)
Species brought into synonymy
 Solatia arafurensis Verhecken, 1997: synonym of Mirandaphera arafurensis (Verhecken, 1997)
 Solatia solat Jousseaume, 1887: synonym of Solatia piscatoria (Gmelin, 1791)

References

 Hemmen, J. (2007). Recent Cancellariidae. Annotated and illustrated catalogue of Recent Cancellariidae. Privately published, Wiesbaden. 428 pp.

External links
 Jousseaume F.P. (1887). La famille Cancellariidae (Mollusques Gastéropodes). Le Naturaliste. ser. 2, 9(13): 155-157
  Gofas, S.; Le Renard, J.; Bouchet, P. (2001). Mollusca. in: Costello, M.J. et al. (eds), European Register of Marine Species: a check-list of the marine species in Europe and a bibliography of guides to their identification. Patrimoines Naturels. 50: 180-213

Cancellariidae
Gastropod genera
Taxa named by Félix Pierre Jousseaume